Wu Chun-lin (born 14 January 1968), better known by his stage name Wu Bai, is a Taiwanese rock singer, songwriter and actor. He formed the band Wu Bai & China Blue with Dean Zavolta (drums), Yu Ta-hao (keyboards) and Chu Chien-hui (bass guitar), while Wu himself is the lead guitarist and vocalist of the band. Dubbed "The King of Live Music", Wu is considered to be one of the biggest pop music stars in East and Southeast Asia.

Early life

Wu was born in Suantou, Lioujiao—literally "Garlic Village"—in Chiayi County in south-central Taiwan. His father was a retired Taiwan Sugar Corporation worker and his mother a betel nut vendor, and he had two younger brothers who died in a car accident.  His nickname Wu Bai, meaning "five hundred," derives from several stories, none of which can be proven to be fact: one story says the name came from his early academic success when he scored 100 points on each of five examination subjects when he was studying at middle school. However, an interest in music in his teenage years led to a decline in his academic performance and he failed to pass the university entrance examinations. Another story says he used to charge 500 Taiwan Dollars for his early concerts.

Career

Overview 
Wu is one of the biggest rock stars in Mandarin-language music markets, including Taiwan, China, Hong Kong, Singapore, and Malaysia. His music is also known in Japan, the United States, Canada, Australia and Ireland. He also has released a number of works performed in Taiwanese Hokkien. Throughout the years, he held numerous sold out concerts in Taiwan, Singapore, Malaysia and Hong Kong and has performed in North America as well.  His albums have won many awards and have topped the sales charts. He writes almost all of his own songs for his albums and also writes for many popular artists including Andy Lau, Emil Chau, Karen Mok, Tarcy Su, and Vivian Hsu. His guitar-driven rock music differs from that of many Mandopop or Cantopop stars and, with his Taiwanese Mandarin accent and rough looks, he projects an image of an archetypal Taiwanese punkster (taike) in his music and film roles.

Early career and the formation of China Blue
Wu left Chiayi County for the capital of Taipei in the late 1980s and worked in a number of menial jobs.  One of those jobs in a music shop led to the formation of his first band, Buzz, which soon broke up.

Dean Zavolta describes the formation of Wu Bai & China Blue noting that the members originally "played for different bands up until about 1991, after which [Chu Chien-hui] and I began jamming together with the eventual idea of forming a newer, fresher, and original rock band...Then one day, he called me up and asked me if I would mind filling in for a one-off gig with himself and a guitarist named Wu Bai...Something just clicked between us. Both the music and the mo chi ( – chemistry) we had were fantastic.  What really helped us though, was that when we first came out, Taiwan—along with other Asian countries—was ready for an Asian rock band that played live music."

Wu debuted with two songs on the Taiwanese-language Dust of Angels Soundtrack in 1992 which were credited to his real name, Wu Chun-lin, and featured Chu Chien-hui and Dean Zavolta credited as China Blue.  The same year, Pony Canyon Taiwan released Wu's first album, Loving Others is a Happy Thing, a solo effort credited to Wu, and featuring each of the three other  China Blue members on at least one song but without the group being mentioned by name.  The 1993 soundtrack to Treasure Island featured Wu with the three members of China Blue designated as such.  All subsequent albums  have been credited to Wu Bai & China Blue.

Growing popularity
Wu's initial releases were followed by performing live at pubs throughout Taiwan, notably Sleeping Earth in Taipei and, upon its closure, Live A Go-Go.  As his fan base grew, "Friday with Wu Bai" became a weekly event for many listeners, especially college students. Based on this increasing popularity, Wu was given a contract with Rock Records' Mandala Works, which released his second album Wanderer's Love Song and accompanying music videos. Sales were limited but Wu's following continued to grow due to his live performances.

Music and film success
In January 1996, Wu Bai & China Blue brought their powerful live show to Hong Kong for the first time to great success and Wu began to be known as Taiwan's "King of Live Music." Later that year they released the smash hit album The End of Love, which, propelled by the hit single "Norwegian Forest," sold over 600,000 copies and was honored by the China Times and the United Evening News as one of the year's Top 10 albums. The album also ranked in the Top 20 Music Videos on television's Channel [V]  and was nominated by MTV for the best music video of the year.

In June 1998, after representing Taiwan Beer in its new television commercial, Wu also appeared in a Chinese movie A Beautiful New World, playing the part of a street singer.  He also wrote and sang the title song for the movie.

In 1999, Wu had a small role in The Personals, a motion picture with good box office sales. That November, Wu released a Mandarin album, White Dove, and started a tour of three cities in Taiwan. He held six sold-out concerts in a gigantic tent called "Super Dome", which was also a ground breaking event for the Taiwanese concert scene. The album and the concerts were the first big events after Taiwan's devastating earthquake, which comforted so many people's broken hearts. As a result, Wu was voted as the most popular singer of the year, and also rank number three as the Man of the Year, outranking the President of the Republic of China Lee Teng-hui.

In the year 2000, Wu wrote and sang the theme song for the Pili movie Legend of the Sacred Stone. This time his backing music had a full orchestra, and the lyrics were written in Classical Chinese. Between March and April, Wu Bai and China Blue held three concerts in Singapore, Malaysia and Hong Kong. In Singapore, the Straits Times' headline after the concert was "King of Chinese Rock", in Malaysia, the media headline was "Cult Master arrived, all congregation bowed." and in Hong Kong, the whole audience stood up in a stadium that has rules against standing during concerts. After these phenomenal successes, Wu sang at Taiwan's new president's inauguration, Singapore's National Day concert, and Japan Fukuoka's Music Festival. In Fukuoka, Japanese audiences all stood up to enjoy the concert even though they likely did not understand the lyrics. Wu has also appeared in Tsui Hark's movie Time and Tide as the lead actor, and also wrote two songs for the soundtrack.

Music
Wu listened to 1970s English-language rock music such as Led Zeppelin and Jimi Hendrix in his formative years and has said he felt it unusual for a Taiwanese person to play the guitar. Prior to Wu Bai & China Blue's achieving widespread popularity in Taiwan in the mid-1990s, guitar-oriented rock music was unusual in the country's domestic popular music scene.  Live concerts were similarly rare but the group's frequent touring and live album releases set a new standard for live performing in Taiwan. The band's distinctive blend of poetical lyrics with rock tunes has won them fans not only in Taiwan but throughout East and Southeast Asia and they have had successful regional concert tours in the many cities.

Personal life
In 2003, Wu married Chen Wen-pey (陳文珮), his manager and girlfriend for over 10 years, in a private ceremony in Fukuoka, Japan.

Wu is an avid fan of Japanese pro wrestling, and has even written a theme song for his close friend, Keiji Mutoh.

Discography

Studio albums
 愛上別人是快樂的事 (Loving Others is a Happy Thing) (1992)
 浪人情歌 (Wanderer's Love Song) (1994)
 愛情的盡頭 (The End of Love) (1996)
 樹枝孤鳥 (Lonely Tree, Lonely Bird) (1998)
 世界第一等 (No.1 in the World) EP (1998)
 白鴿 (White Dove) (1999)
 伍佰&CHINA BLUE電影歌曲典藏 / 順流逆流電影原聲帶 (Wu Bai & China Blue Movie Song Book / Time and Tide Soundtrack) (2000)
 夢的河流 (Dream River) (2001)
 淚橋 (Tear Bridge) (2003) (CD+VCD)
 雙面人 (Two Faced Man) (2005)
 GO PA 人面鯊 (2005)
 純真年代 (Innocent Years) (2006) (CD+DVD)
 忘情1015 新歌＋精選 （2007）（CD+DVD）
 太空彈 (Spacebomb)（2008）
 詩情搖滾 (Poetic Rock) (2009) (CD+DVD)
 單程車票 (One Way Ticket) (2011)
 無盡閃亮的哀愁 (Endless Shining Sadness) (2013)
 釘子花() (2016)
 讓水倒流 (jang4 shui3 tao4 liu2)(2019)

Live albums
 伍佰的LIVE (1995)
 夏夜晚風 (1997)
 伍佰97亞洲巡弋紀念盤EP (1997)
 空襲警報 (1999)
 1999~2000真世界巡迴演唱會全紀錄 (2000)
 冬之火 (2002)
 伍佰力 (2004)
 2005厲害演唱會全紀錄 (2005)
 妳是我的花朵演唱會全紀錄（2007）
 生命的現場 Life Live (2012)
 光和熱 (2015)

Soundtracks and compilations
 Dust of Angels Soundtrack (少年吔，安啦！) (1992) – 2 songs
 Treasure Island Soundtrack (只要為你活一天) (1993) – 2 songs
 Time and Tide Soundtrack (順流逆流) (2000)
 Legend of the Sacred Stone Soundtrack (聖石傳說) (2000)

Music and concert videos
 2005厲害演唱會全紀錄 (2005)
 妳是我的花朵演唱會全紀錄（2007）
 太空彈 世界巡迴演唱會精選實錄 (2009)

Filmography

Film

Television series

 Music video appearances 

Books
伍佰‧風景 (Fēngjǐng) (Scenery), a book of Wu Bai's photography
伍佰‧故事 (Gùshì) (Story), a book of Wu Bai's photography
伍佰‧台北 (Táiběi) (Taipei''), a book of Wu Bai's photography

Awards and nominations

References

External links

 Wu Bai & China Blue Official Website includes discography and photographs taken by Wu Bai  
 Fortune Cookie 500, an American fan website 
 

1968 births
Living people
Avex Group artists
Chinese rock musicians
Taiwanese male film actors
21st-century Taiwanese male actors
20th-century Taiwanese male actors
21st-century Taiwanese male singers
20th-century Taiwanese male singers
Taiwanese Mandopop singer-songwriters
Taiwanese Hokkien pop singers
Taiwanese rock musicians
People from Chiayi County